St. Michael's Mission may refer to:

 St. Michael's Mission (Window Rock, Arizona), listed on the National Register of Historic Places in Apache County, Arizona
 St. Michael's Mission (Conesus, New York)
 St. Michael's Mission (Ethete, Wyoming), listed on the National Register of Historic Places in Fremont County, Wyoming
 St. Michael's Mission (Natal, South Africa)